East Penn Railroad  is a short-line railroad that operates a number of mostly-unconnected lines in the U.S. states of Pennsylvania and Delaware. Except for two industrial park switching operations, all are former Pennsylvania Railroad or Reading Company lines, abandoned or sold by Conrail or its predecessors.

ESPN was formed in 2007 through the merger of East Penn Railways  and Penn Eastern Rail Lines , each of which began operating in the 1990s. The railroad is owned by Regional Rail, LLC, which also owns the Middletown and New Jersey Railroad, Tyburn Railroad, Carolina Coastal Railway, Florida Central Railroad, Florida Northern Railroad, and Florida Midland Railroad.

History
East Penn Railroad (ESPN) was formed in 2007 by the merger of East Penn Railway and Penn Eastern Rail Lines. Since the merger, the railroad has improved service and infrastructure on lines with customer growth potential; weaker lines were abandoned or sold off.  of track was returned to service. A yard was also constructed in Pocopson, Pennsylvania along the Wilmington & Northern (W&N). ESPN has acquired additional locomotives and replaced older locomotives to handle increased traffic, including the acquisition of two rebuilt EMD GP38-2's from GATX to be used along the W&N and Octoraro lines.

ESPN attempted to abandon the Colebrookdale line between Pottstown and Boyertown in 2008; it was eventually purchased by Berks County. In 2010, the Chester Valley line between King of Prussia and Bridgeport was abandoned and subsequently sold to Montgomery County so that it can become a part of the Chester Valley Rail Trail.

On August 1, 2011, the East Penn Railroad began operations on the York Industrial Track between York and Stony Brook, taking over operations from Norfolk Southern. In December 2012, the former Raritan River 40' boxcar #100, stored on East Penn tracks at its Quakertown depot, was restored, one of the few surviving pieces of equipment from the former Raritan River Railroad.

Since 2011, a total of eight derailments have happened along the East Penn Railroad in various locations including northern Delaware, Chester County, and Bucks County. In August 2022, six cars derailed in Chester County, narrowly missing a home.

Operations
ESPN operates 114 miles of track in eastern Pennsylvania and northern Delaware with a roster of 16 locomotives. The railroad operates multiple disconnected segments with locomotives assigned to each segment. Usually, two or three lines have service on a single day.

Lines operated

The East Penn Railroad operates the following railroad lines:

Bristol 
This line consists of industrial park trackage in the Bristol, Pennsylvania area, interchanging with Conrail Shared Assets Operations (CSAO).

Lancaster Northern 
This line, which is owned and operated by ESPN, runs from Ephrata, Pennsylvania northeast to interchange with Norfolk Southern Railway (NS) in Reading, Pennsylvania, using trackage rights on NS between Sinking Spring, Pennsylvania and Reading.

Manheim
This line consists of owned trackage in the Manheim, Pennsylvania area, interchanging with NS.

North East Philadelphia 
This line consists of owned trackage in Northeast Philadelphia, Pennsylvania, interchanging with CSAO in Bustleton.

Octoraro 
This line, which is owned and operated by ESPN, consists of trackage (the former Octoraro Branch) from end-of-track in Sylmar, Pennsylvania east to Chadds Ford, Pennsylvania where it connects to the Wilmington & Northern line. SEPTA still owns the passenger rights on the Octoraro Line.

Perkiomen
This line, which is owned and operated by ESPN, runs from Pennsburg, Pennsylvania north to interchange with NS in Emmaus, Pennsylvania.

Quakertown
The line operates on the SEPTA-owned Bethlehem Line from Quakertown, Pennsylvania south to interchange with Pennsylvania Northeastern Railroad in Telford, Pennsylvania.

Wilmington & Northern

The line, which is owned and operated by ESPN, runs from interchange with CSX Transportation in Elsmere Junction, Delaware north to interchange with NS in Coatesville, Pennsylvania.  Also the Octoraro Line connects with the Wilmington & Northern line in Chadds Ford, Pennsylvania.

York Industrial Track
The line operated by ESPN consists of trackage from interchange with NS in York, Pennsylvania to Stony Brook, Pennsylvania.

Former
Colebrookdale – operated from Boyertown, Pennsylvania south to interchange with NS in Pottstown, Pennsylvania. ESPN attempted to abandon the line in 2008. The Berks County Redevelopment Authority purchased the railroad that same year, and appointed the Eastern Berks Gateway Railroad to operate freight service. The Eastern Berks Gateway Railroad has left the line in late 2013 due to no or very little freight on the line. The Colebrookdale Railroad Preservation Trust was also created in 2011 for tourist railroad purposes. Tourist rail service began in October 2014 as the Colebrookdale Railroad.
Chester Valley – owned and operated from King of Prussia, Pennsylvania north to interchange with NS in Bridgeport, Pennsylvania. The line was abandoned by ESPN in 2010; tracks were dismantled in May 2011. The line will be converted into a portion of the Chester Valley Rail Trail by Montgomery County.
Kutztown – operated on trackage owned by the Kutztown Transportation Authority from Kutztown, Pennsylvania southeast to interchange with NS in Topton, Pennsylvania. This line is now operated by the Allentown & Auburn Railroad, which hauls passengers in historic equipment, as well as freight for local businesses.
Venice Island Industrial Spur - Operated on trackage owned by Norfolk Southern from West Falls Yard to the end of Venice Island in the Manayunk neighborhood of Philadelphia and abandoned April 4, 2017.

References

External links

Norfolk Southern: list of shortlines: East Penn Railroad
East Penn Railroad discussion group
Norfolk Southern names ESPN Short Line of the Quarter

Delaware railroads
Pennsylvania railroads
Railway companies established in 2007
Switching and terminal railroads